The 2010 United States Senate election in Alaska took place on November 2, 2010, to elect a member of the United States Senate to represent the State of Alaska, alongside 33 U.S. Senate elections in other states, elections in all states for the U.S. House of Representatives, as well as various state and local elections.

The general election was preceded by primary elections which were held on August 24, 2010. Scott McAdams, the Mayor of Sitka, became the Democratic nominee; Joe Miller, an attorney and former federal magistrate, became the Republican nominee after defeating incumbent U.S. Senator Lisa Murkowski. Miller was endorsed by the Tea Party movement and former Governor Sarah Palin. Murkowski announced that regardless of her defeat in the primary, she would run in the general election as a write-in candidate.

Murkowski garnered more than 100,000 write-in votes in the general election, 8,000 of which were challenged by Miller for various errors including minor misspellings. Even if the challenged votes were all thrown out, Murkowski still had a lead of over 2,100 votes when the counting was done. The Associated Press and the Alaska GOP called the race in Murkowski's favor on November 17, and Murkowski proclaimed herself the winner on November 18. Miller did not concede the race and instead filed legal challenges which stopped the Alaska Division of Elections from certifying Murkowski as the winner. On December 10, the Alaska Superior Court in Juneau rejected Miller's State law claims, ruling that Alaska statutes and case law do not require perfect spelling on write-in ballots if voter intent is clear. The Superior Court judge also dismissed Miller's claims of vote fraud as based on speculation. Miller took his appeal to the Alaska Supreme Court, citing a provision in the Alaska election statute that says there shall be "no exceptions" to the rules for counting ballots, and arguing that therefore, all ballots with misspellings or other deviations should be thrown out.  The court heard oral arguments on December 17. Miller also had a pending case in federal court raising U.S. constitutional claims that the Elections and the Due Process Clauses were violated by state election authorities; the federal court could consider the claims once Miller's State court options were exhausted.

On December 30, 2010, Alaska state officials certified Lisa Murkowski as the winner of the election, making her only the second U.S. Senate candidate since the passage of the Seventeenth Amendment to win election via write-in and defeat candidates with ballot access, after Strom Thurmond in 1954. On December 31, Miller announced at a news conference in Anchorage that he was conceding. Murkowski thus became the first person in 40 years to win election to the Senate with under 40% of the vote.

Primary systems 
Alaska's primary elections consist of a closed primary ballot for voters that have declared themselves as Republicans and an open primary ballot for Democrats, Libertarians, the Alaska Independence Party, and all other declared or write-in candidates.

Open primary

Candidates 
 David Haase (L)
 Jacob Seth Kern (D)
 Scott McAdams (D), mayor of Sitka
 Frank Vondersaar (D), perennial candidate

Results

Republican primary

Candidates 
 Lisa Murkowski, incumbent U.S. Senator since 2002
 Joe Miller, former U.S. magistrate judge

Endorsements

Polling

Results 

Murkowski conceded the primary race to Joe Miller on August 31, 2010.

Aftermath 
When it began to appear that Miller had won the primary, the Libertarian Party floated the possibility of offering Murkowski its nomination; the Murkowski campaign said it would not rule out a third party run, and Murkowski said it was too premature. But on August 29, 2010, the executive board of the state Libertarian Party voted not to consider allowing Murkowski on its ticket for the U.S. Senate race. When asked about a write-in candidacy at that time, she said it was "high risk". By September 7 though, she said that she was weighing the option of mounting a write-in campaign. On September 13, Libertarian candidate David Haase reiterated that he would not stand down and let Murkowski replace him on the ballot. Murkowski announced on September 17 that she would enter the general election contest as a write-in candidate, saying she had agonized over the decision, but had been encouraged to run by many voters.

General election

Candidates 
 Timothy Carter (I)
 Ted Gianoutsos (I), perennial candidate
 David Haase (L), nominee for the U.S. Senate in 2008
 Scott McAdams (D), Mayor of Sitka
 Joe Miller (R), former U.S. magistrate judge
 Lisa Murkowski (R; write-in), incumbent U.S. Senator

Campaign 
After Lisa Murkowski conceded the Republican primary to Joe Miller, Scott McAdams raised over $128,000 through ActBlue, and a private fundraiser at the home of Alaskan State Senator Hollis French raised about $19,000.

Miller received negative press in mid-October 2010 when his campaign's security guards made a private arrest of a journalist who was persistently questioning Miller about his record as a government employee. Tony Hopfinger, of the Alaska Dispatch, was detained and handcuffed until Anchorage police arrived and released him following a townhall event featuring Miller. No charges were filed. Though the campaign event was open to the general public and held at a public school, the security firm said it had detained the journalist because he had been trespassing and had shoved a man while attempting to question Miller.

On October 20, during early voting, a voter in Homer photographed a list of write-in candidates that was posted inside a voting booth, which raised the issue of whether the state should be posting, or even providing such a list. A lawsuit was filed alleging that the Alaska Division of Elections was violating AAC, 25.070, which reads in part: "Information regarding a write-in candidate may not be discussed, exhibited or provided at the polling place, or within 200 feet of any entrance to the polling place, on election day." Both Republican and Democratic spokespersons decried the lists as electioneering on behalf of Murkowski; representatives of the Division of Elections maintained that the lists were intended merely to assist voters. On October 27, a judge issued a restraining order barring the lists, noting in his decision "If it were important 'assistance' for the Division to provide voters with lists of write-in candidates, then the Division was asleep at the switch for the past 50 years, the Division first developed the need for a write-in candidate list 12 days ago." Later on the same day, the Alaska Supreme Court ruled that the lists could be distributed to those who asked for them, but that any ballots cast by voters based on information on the lists be "segregated". The Division of Elections responded that they had neither the manpower nor the time to implement such a system by Election Day. By the deadline for registering as a write-in candidate, more than 150 Alaskans had submitted their names as candidates for the U.S. Senate seat, encouraged by an Anchorage talk radio host.

In the election, the total number of write-in votes statewide were counted first, then all the write-in ballots were sent to Juneau to the Division of Elections to be individually examined to see what names were written on them.

Predictions

Polling

Note

 It was announced on 9/13/10 that Murkowski cannot run on the Libertarian ticket.

Fundraising

Results

Post-election day events

Overview 
On election day, the write-in ballots were counted, but not examined: determining for which candidate they were cast was deferred. After election officials tabulated 27,000 additional absentee and early ballots, Miller had won 35 percent of the vote while forty percent of the ballots cast were write-ins, which required a hand count to see what names were on them.

Write-in count 
Alaska election officials said they were counting write-in ballots with misspellings if the names written in were phonetic to Murkowski, claiming that Alaska case law supports this practice. The Miller campaign had observers present who challenged ballots which misspelled "Murkowski", or which included the word "Republican" next to Murkowski's name. The Anchorage Daily News noted on November 11 that the bulk of the challenged ballots contained misspellings but examples were not hard to find of challenged ballots that appeared to be "spelled accurately and looked to be filled out properly".

After several days of counting, the Division of Elections showed Murkowski with a lead of some 1,700 votes over Miller, with about 8,000 write-in votes yet to be counted, and a trend of counting 97 percent of the write-ins as for Murkowski. Murkowski's campaign shied away from declaring a victory before the count was finished. As of November 17, (the last day of the hand count), the Division of Elections showed Murkowski having a lead of over 10,000 votes, meaning that even if all the 8,000 challenged ballots were discounted, Murkowski would still lead by about 2,200 votes. The Miller campaign then demanded a hand recount of the entire election, claiming that as Murkowski's votes were all verified by visual inspection, Miller should get the same opportunity. The Division of Election officials responded that any recount of non-write-in votes would not be done by hand, but would be done using optical scanners.

Lawsuits 

Miller filed a federal lawsuit on November 9, 2010, seeking to have write-in ballots that contained spelling and other errors from being counted toward Murkowski's total and a seeking preliminary injunction to prevent the counting of the write-in votes from even beginning. He claimed that he had a federal case because State election officials were violating the  Elections Clause of the U.S. Constitution and the Equal Protection Clause of the 14th Amendment by using a voter intent standard that allowed misspelled write-in votes to count. The federal court allowed the counting to proceed as the challenged ballots were segregated from the others and could be re-examined later, if necessary. After hearing motions and arguments from both sides, the federal court abstained from hearing the case, ruling that the dispute could be resolved by the State courts by reference to State law. The federal court kept the case in its docket in the event that federal issues still remained after the State courts' determination. The federal court also put a halt to the certification of the election pending rulings on Miller's lawsuits. Miller then filed suit in State court, repeating the claims he had previously made, and adding allegations of vote fraud and bias. On December 10, the Alaska Superior Court rejected all of Miller's claims as contrary to State statute and case law, and said the fraud claims were unsubstantiated. Miller then appealed the Superior Court ruling to the Alaska Supreme Court, citing a provision in the Alaska election statute that says there shall be "no exceptions" to the rules for counting ballots, and that therefore, all ballots with misspellings or other deviations should be thrown out.  After oral arguments were heard on December 17, on December 22, the Alaska Supreme Court upheld the lower court's ruling dismissing Miller's claims. On December 26, Miller announced that he would be withdrawing his opposition for Murkowski's Senate certification, but would continue pursuing the federal case. On December 31, Miller announced at a news conference in Anchorage that he was conceding.

Write-in results

Certified results

References

External links 
 Alaska Division of Elections
 U.S. Congress candidates for Alaska at Project Vote Smart
 Alaska U.S. Senate from OurCampaigns.com
 Campaign contributions from OpenSecrets
 2010 Alaska Senate Election graph of multiple polls from Pollster.com

 2010 Alaska Senate Race from Real Clear Politics
 2010 Alaska Senate Race from CQ Politics
 Race profile from The New York Times
Debates
 RUNNING debates hosted by KAKM, audio and video
 Alaska Senate Republican Primary Debate, C-SPAN, August 19, 2010
Official campaign websites
 Fredrick "David" Haase for U.S. Senate
 Joe Miller for U.S. Senate
 Lisa Murkowski for U.S. Senate
 Frank Vondersaar
 Certified Results

2010 Alaska elections
Alaska
2010